The Bangulzai are one of the Sarawan Brahui tribes of Balochistan.

References

Brahui tribes